is a Japanese former actress active during the silent film era in the early 1930s.

Biography
She was born in Meguro-ku, Tokyo, Japan. Her sister Kiyoko Tagawa was a dancer. Mizukubo acted at the Shochiku Kamata and the Nikkatsu Tamagawa studios, and appeared in 39 movies as a young star, including films directed by Naruse Mikio and Ozu Yasujiro. She quit film-acting in 1935, but continued to dance and appear in stage roles.

Filmography

References

External links

1916 births
Possibly living people
20th-century Japanese actresses
Japanese film actresses
Japanese silent film actresses